Pajam is a small town in Negeri Sembilan, Malaysia.

References

Towns in Negeri Sembilan